Elisabeth von Samsonow is an Austrian artist and philosopher. She is the Professor for Philosophical and Historical Anthropology at the Kunst an der Akademie der bildenden Künste, Vienna. She is also a member of GEDOK Munich.

After she studied Philosophy and Theology at the Ludwig-Maximilians-Universität München she worked there from 1987 as a Professor for Renaissance-Philosophy, until 1991 where she was a professor at the University Vienna. Since 1996 she is a professor at the Akademie der bildenden Künste, Wien berufen.

Publications 
 Egon Schiele - Sanctus Franciscus Hystericus, Wien: Passagen Verlag 2012
 Egon Schiele - Ich bin die Vielen. Mit einem Nachwort von Peter Sloterdijk, Wien: Passagen Verlag 2010
 Anti-Elektra. Totemismus und Schizogamie, Zürich/Berlin: diaphanes, 2007, 
 Flusser Lectures. Was ist anorganischer Sex wirklich? Theorie und kurze Geschichte der hypnogenen Subjekte und Objekte, Köln: Buchhandlung Walther König, 2005
 Biographien des organlosen Körpers (Hg. mit Éric Alliez), Wien: Turia und Kant, 2003
 Sex-Politik (Hg. mit Doris Guth), Wien: Turia und Kant, 2001
 Chroma Drama. Widerstand der Farbe (Hg. mit Éric Alliez), Wien: Turia und Kant, 2001
 Fenster im Papier: Die imaginäre Kollision der Architektur mit der Schrift oder die Gedächtnisrevolution der Renaissance, München: Fink, 2001
 Telenoia. Kritik der virtuellen Bilder (Hg. mit Éric Alliez), Wien: Turia und Kant, 1999
 Hyperplastik. Kunst und Konzepte der Wahrnehmung in Zeiten der mental imagery (Hg. mit Éric Alliez), Wien: Turia und Kant, 1998
 Die Erzeugung des Sichtbaren. Die philosophische Begründung naturwissenschaftlicher Wahrheit bei Johannes Kepler, München: Fink, 1987

External links 
 
Homepage of Elisabeth von Samsonow
Elisabeth von Samsonow: Wunderbare Reise einer Statue

Living people
Year of birth missing (living people)
Austrian women philosophers
20th-century Austrian philosophers
Austrian non-fiction writers
20th-century Austrian women writers
Philosophers of art